Ashleigh Marie Gnat (born November 13, 1994, in Altamonte Springs, Florida) is a former American collegiate gymnast and coach. She competed for the Louisiana State University gymnastics team from 2014 to 2017. Gnat coached as an assistant coach at Penn State in 2020. She is now an assistant coach at her alma mater, Louisiana State University.

Early life 
Gnat was born on November 13, 1994, in Altamonte Springs to parents Ray and Joan (née Moore) Gnat. Her father was an All-American gymnast for the now-defunct LSU men's gymnastics program, and her mother was a 1972 Olympian. She has three older siblings from her mother's first marriage to Bob Rice, a former Temple gymnast—two brothers, Sean and Stephen, a film editor at Full Sail University, and a sister, Jeana Rice-Helms (b. November 22, 1981), who competed for the University of Alabama and was the 2004 NCAA champion in women's gymnastics.

She started gymnastics in 1997, shortly after her parents opened ACE Gymnastics, a facility in Longwood, Florida.

Club career

2007–09 
Gnat reached Level 9 in USA Gymnastics' Junior Olympic program at the age of 11 and finished eighth at the 2007 Eastern Championships, placing higher than the eventual 2012 Olympic all-around champion, Gabby Douglas.

She moved up to Level 10 for the 2008 season, when she was 13. She placed second in the all-around at Regionals, in addition to taking the vault and bars titles, and advanced to her first J.O. Nationals in Orlando, where she finished nineteenth in the all-around.

A year later, Gnat was third in the all-around at States and won vault and floor. At Regionals, she took home a gold medal on floor and silver medals in the all-around, on vault and on bars. In mid-May, she participated in her second J.O. Nationals, finishing ninth in the all-around and tying for third on floor with three other gymnasts.

2010–13 
Gnat qualified to the inaugural Nastia Liukin Cup in 2010 and finished 21st in the all-around. Later in the year, she claimed both the State and Regional all-around titles, before tying for seventh at her third J.O. Nationals. In 2011, she defended her Regional title in the all-around, but a disappointing performance at Nationals left her in fifteenth place.

She qualified to her second Nastia Liukin Cup in 2012 and placed 22nd in the all-around. Later, she was the Florida champion in the all-around and on three events. She tied for second in the all-around at Regionals and placed fifth at Nationals in May.

Gnat's final club competitive season, in 2013, turned out to be her best. At the Lady Luck Invitational in Las Vegas, she scored a perfect 10 on vault, which secured her the ranking of No. 1 in the nation on that event. She also earned her third Nastia Liukin Cup berth, a rare feat. At the Cup, she tied for eighth in the all-around with 2012 winner Charity Jones. She was the state champion in the all-around and on three events. At Regionals, she swept all five titles, logging her highest ever all-around score of 39.000 and finishing the season with the fifth highest all-around ranking in the nation.

At her fifth and final J.O. Nationals, Gnat was second in the all-around. In addition, she was the vault champion and joint floor champion with Kullen Hlawek. As a result, she was named to the USA Gymnastics J.O. national team.

College career 
On January 9, 2012, Gnat verbally committed to the Louisiana State University women's gymnastics team. She signed the National Letter of Intent on November 16, 2012.

During her freshman season in 2014, she saw action on vault, beam and floor. At the SEC Championships, she contributed on vault and beam.

Career Perfect 10.0

Personal life 
Gnat graduated from Lake Mary High School in 2013. She is currently studying sports administration at Louisiana State University.

References 

1994 births
Living people
American female artistic gymnasts
Louisiana State University alumni
Level 10 gymnasts
LSU Tigers women's gymnasts
People from Altamonte Springs, Florida
People from Lake Mary, Florida
Sportspeople from Seminole County, Florida
NCAA gymnasts who have scored a perfect 10